Industrias Licoreras de Guatemala is a Guatemalan alcohol distillery which produces different kinds of alcohol and which owns different brands. It was created at the beginning of the 20th century by Venancio, Andrés, Felipe, Jesús and Alejandro Botran, who emigrated from Spain to start a distillery business. It is a private company and it is the biggest of the three distilling companies operating in Guatemala.

Types of alcohols produced

Dark rum
White rum
Aguardiente
Bottled cocktail
Vodka
 Brandy
 Tequila
 Whiskey  
Liqueur coffee

Owned brands

Ron Zacapa Centenario XO
Ron Zacapa Centenario 23
Ron Botran Reserva
Botran Solera 1893
Ron Botran Añejo 12
Ron Botran añejo 8
Ron Botran Oro
Ron Botran XL
Sello de Oro Venado Especial
Venado Light
Venado Citron
Ron Caribbean Bay
Quetzalteca Edicion Especial
Quetzalteca Rosa de Jamaica y Tamarindo
Venado
Chaparrita
Barrilito
Anis Guaca
Valeroso Kuto
Jaguar
Tucan
Botran VIP Sabores frutales
Botran VIP Cocteles
Cubata Botran
Vodka Black by Botran
Vodka Red by Botran
Cafetto

References

External links
 http://industriaslicorerasdeguatemala.com/

Distilleries
Food and drink companies of Guatemala